Ilyas Khamzatovich Akhmadov (born December 19, 1960) served as the foreign minister of the Chechen Republic of Ichkeria. He currently resides in the United States, where he was granted political asylum.

Biography
Akhmadov was born on December 19, 1960, in Kazakhstan, where most of the Chechen nation—including his family—had been exiled by Stalin's government in 1944. The Akhmadovs returned to Chechnya in 1962.

From 1978 to 1981 Ilyas Akhmadov studied in the Polytechnic University of Volgograd. After graduation, he served for four years as a Sergeant Major in the Red Army's Strategic Missile Forces. He left the army in 1985 as a Third Lieutenant, and in 1991 he graduated with distinction in political science from the Rostov University.

Returning to Chechnya, which had declared independence from Russia in the aftermath of the dissolution of the Soviet Union in 1991, he took a job in the political department of the Chechen Ministry of Foreign Affairs. In August 1994 Akhmadov was wounded during the fighting with forces of the warlord Ruslan Labazanov in Argun.

After the First Chechen War broke in 1994, Akhmadov fought against the Russian federal forces, serving first as a volunteer fighter and then as the public affairs officer to Aslan Maskhadov, the Chechen headquarters' chief of staff. In 1996 he retired to private life.

Exile
On July 29, 1999, a month before the beginning of the Second Chechen War, the President of Ichkeria Aslan Maskhadov appointed Ilyas Akhmadov as Foreign Minister. Soon, Akhmadov and his colleagues in the separatist government dispersed and went into hiding, with some again taking up arms against the Russians. Akhmadov himself left Chechnya.

In his appeals and meetings with the representatives of UN, OSCE, PACE, European Parliament, UNHCR, U.S. Congress, the U.S. presidential administration and international NGOs, he called for observance of human rights during the conflict. In January 2000, Akhmadov visited the United States, where he met with officials of the State Department. He embarked on a tour of Western capitals, returning twice to the United States in 2000 and again in 2001. This provoked complaints from Russia, which alleged that he was involved in terrorism in Chechnya and elsewhere in Russia.

In 2002 Akhmadov claimed asylum in the United States but his initial bid was turned down after opposition from the United States Department of Homeland Security. However, he gained support from members of the U.S. Congress and peace campaigners, who saw him as a moderate (indeed, Akhmadov has repeatedly criticised suicide bombings and hostage-takings by Chechen extremists and has campaigned for peace talks to end the war). In April 2004 an Immigration Judge in Boston issued an order granting Akhmadov asylum in the United States; that ruling became effective in August 2004 following the U.S. Government's abrupt withdrawal of its notice of appeal of the Immigration Judge's decision.

See also
List of people granted political asylum

External links
Articles by Akhmadov
 Russia's Dirty War Against Chechnya, 19 April 2001
 Talk peace in Chechnya in The Boston Globe, 29 September 2003
 A Chechnya Plan: Talk in The Washington Post, 10 December 2004
 Russia's Forgotten War in The Boston Globe,  February 24, 2005

Interviews with Akhmadov
 June 1999 interview about the first war
 Chechnya fears 'total destruction' from BBC News, November 9, 1999
 Chechen Foreign Minister of Chechnya Ilyas Akhmadov Visits RFE from Radio Free Europe/Radio Liberty, 15 November 1999

Stories on Akhmadov
 U.S. Puts a Low Profile on Meeting With Chechen Foreign Minister, on a Clinton Administration meeting with Akhmadov, from The New York Times, January 14, 2000
 Sacrificing Principle to Putin, on Akhmadov's asylum case, from The Washington Post, December 16, 2003
 Two-Faced Chechnya Policy, on Akhmadov's asylum case, from The Washington Post, June 30, 2004
 Editorial supporting the granting of asylum to Akhmadov in the U.S. from The Washington Post, August 10, 2004
 Story of Akhmadov's asylum in the U.S., and Followup questions from The Washington Post, March 20, 2005

Bibliography
 Ilyas Akhmadov, Miriam Lanskoy. The Chechen Struggle: Independence Won and Lost. - Palgrave Macmillan, 2010. 

1960 births
American Muslims
American people of Chechen descent
Chechen politicians
Chechen militants
Chechen nationalists
Foreign ministers
Living people
People of the Chechen wars
Politicians of Ichkeria
Soviet Army officers
Chechen warlords
Chechen people
Russian exiles
Russian expatriates in Kazakhstan
North Caucasian independence activists